3000 Miles to Graceland is a 2001 American heist black action comedy film directed, co-written, and co-produced by Demian Lichtenstein. Lichtenstein co-wrote the script with Richard Recco. The film stars Kurt Russell, Kevin Costner, Courteney Cox, David Arquette, Bokeem Woodbine, Christian Slater, Kevin Pollak, and Daisy McCrackin.

3000 Miles to Graceland was released in the United States on February 23, 2001, by Warner Bros. Pictures. The film received mostly negative reviews by the critics and was a box office bomb making only $18.7 million against its $62 million budget.

Plot

Recent parolee Michael Zane stops at a run-down desert motel outside Las Vegas, Nevada. He catches a boy, Jesse, stealing from his car, and chases him back to his mother, Cybil Waingrow, whom he seduces.

The following morning, four men arrive to pick up Michael: Murphy, Hanson, Gus, and Franklin. Dressed in Elvis costumes, the group goes to Las Vegas and robs the Riviera, which is holding an Elvis convention. A firefight breaks out and Franklin is killed during their escape.

Back at the motel, Hanson and Murphy argue about Franklin's share until Murphy shoots Hanson. Michael hides the money in the crawl space, unaware that Jesse is watching him. The three remaining thieves drive into the desert to bury Hanson. Murphy returns alone after shooting Gus and Michael, but crashes his car and is knocked unconscious before reaching the motel.

Michael was wearing a bulletproof vest and survived the shooting by playing dead. He makes his way back to the motel and discovers that the money is missing. Guessing that Jesse was responsible, he storms into Cybil's place and finds the money. He tries to bribe Cybil to forget the situation, but eventually agrees to take Cybil and Jesse with him.

Michael explains that the money is marked, but says Murphy knows a money launderer in Idaho who can help. Murphy, realizing that Michael has taken the money, drives to Idaho to intercept him. At a restaurant, Cybil steals Michael's wallet and sneaks away from Michael and Jesse. She takes Michael's car and calls the money launderer, Peterson, using a password she found in Michael's wallet. Murphy appears at the money launderer's premises using the same password. Peterson explains that Cybil called first, so they wait for her.

Cybil arrives and finds Murphy, who she assumes is Peterson. Michael and Jesse arrive later in a stolen car and find the premises empty except for the bodies of Peterson and his secretary. Michael guesses that Murphy has his car and reports it stolen, causing Murphy to be arrested. The police discover that Michael is also driving a stolen car and arrest him as well. The men are put in adjoining cells and have a confrontation.

Jesse helps Michael make bail after Michael agrees to make him his partner. Murphy calls a man named Jack who helps him make bail. Michael retrieves his car and finds Cybil tied up and gagged in the trunk. Murphy is picked up while hitchhiking, then kills the driver and steals his clothes and vehicle.

Cybil and Jesse drive by. Murphy runs them off the road, and takes Jesse hostage, telling Cybil to find Michael and the money. Cybil begs Michael for help. After some persuasion, Michael decides to help and reports Murphy to the authorities.

Michael meets Murphy at a warehouse with the money and convinces him to release Jesse. As Murphy realizes that the bag is full of cut-up newspaper instead of money, he is stung by a scorpion that Michael hid inside.

A SWAT team surrounds the warehouse. Murphy pretends to surrender but grabs a gun and shoots Michael. A gunfight ensues. Murphy refuses to surrender and is killed by police. An ambulance takes Michael for medical care, but is stolen by Cybil and Jesse. Once again, Michael wore a bulletproof vest, and is only slightly injured. The three escape together and are seen on Michael's boat, the "Graceland."

Cast

Production
Kurt Russell joined the film's cast in January 2000.

Title

The film's title is a reference to Elvis Presley's residence, Graceland, in Memphis, Tennessee. While attempting to capture Thomas J. Murphy, the U.S. Marshals (correctly) believe he is attempting to cross the border into Canada somewhere through Washington/Idaho/Montana, a distance which (as stated by U.S. Marshal Quigley) is "3000 miles to Graceland." Michael also seeks to escape by crossing the border into Canada through Washington.

Music
The film's soundtrack consists of 14 tracks; released by TVT Records on February 20, 2001.

 "Killing Time" by Hed PE
 "It's Gonna Kill Me" by Filter
 "Bleeder" by Nothingface
 "Mansion on the Hill" by Alabama 3
 "Smartbomb" by BT
 "In 2 Deep" by Kenny Wayne Shepherd
 "Who's Your Uncle?" by Uncle Kracker
 "Come in Hard" by Hardknox
 "New Disease" by Spineshank
 "Angel Dust" by Bender
 "Vapor Trail" by The Crystal Method
 "Loaded Gun" by Hednoize
 "Franklin's Requiem" by George S. Clinton
 "Such a Night" by Elvis Presley

Reception

Box office
The film was a box office bomb. It opened at #3 at the North American box office, earning US$7,160,521 in its opening weekend behind Down to Earth and Hannibal.

Critical response
3000 Miles to Graceland received negative reviews by critics. The review aggregator website Rotten Tomatoes reported that 14% of critics gave the film a positive review based on a sample of 97 reviews, with an average score of 3.49/10, with the consensus; "While the premise sounds promising, the movie turns out to be a tedious and unnecessarily violent heist movie that's low on laughs and leaves no cliche unturned." Metacritic, which assigns a weighted average score out of 100 from reviews by mainstream critics, gave the film rating of 21 based on 30 reviews, indicating "generally unfavorable reviews".

Accolades
The film was nominated for five Golden Raspberry Awards including Worst Picture, Worst Actor (Costner), Worst Supporting Actress (Cox), Worst Screenplay, and Worst Screen Couple (Russell and either Costner or Cox) but failed to win any of those categories. The film was also nominated for five Stinkers Bad Movie Awards including Worst Picture, Worst Actor (Costner), Worst Supporting Actress, Most Annoying Fake Accent – Female (Cox), and Most Annoying On-Screen Group (The Elvis Impersonators) but failed to win any of those categories.

See also
 List of films set in Las Vegas

References

External links

 
 

2001 films
2001 action films
2001 black comedy films
2001 crime thriller films
2000s chase films
2000s English-language films
2000s heist films
2000s road movies
American action thriller films
American crime action films
American black comedy films
American crime thriller films
American heist films
American road movies
Cultural depictions of Elvis Presley
Films about child abduction in the United States
Films about families
Films set in Idaho
Films set in the Las Vegas Valley
Films set in Seattle
Films shot in British Columbia
Franchise Pictures films
Morgan Creek Productions films
Warner Bros. films
United States Marshals Service in fiction
Films produced by Elie Samaha
Films scored by George S. Clinton
2000s American films